Great Lakes Bible College (formerly known as the School of Bible and Missions) is a private Bible college associated with the Churches of Christ located in Waterloo, Ontario, Canada. It is accredited by the Ontario Ministry of Education as a private university.

History
Members of Churches of Christ sought to establish a Christian junior college in the late 1940s to provide an opportunity for Christian education for the international populations of the Great Lakes basin. In 1952, high school classes and an adult Bible department were offered in Beamsville, Ontario in the Niagara Peninsula. Great Lakes Christian High School (formerly Great Lakes Christian College), a residential high school provided post-secondary Bible education (the Bible department in 1952 and 1959; the Faculty of Bible and Missions formed in 1969 and renamed in 1975 as the School of Bible and Missions).

GLBC is chartered as a degree-granting institution by the Government of Ontario under the Great Lakes Bible College Act, 1987.

In 1996, classes were moved from Beamsville, Ontario to Waterloo, Ontario.

Mission
The mission is to promote knowledge, understanding, and practice in the Christian faith by equipping Christians and churches for service in the Kingdom of God.

Programs
 Certificate of Biblical Studies (CBS) (1 year)
 Diploma of Biblical Studies (DBS) (2 years)
 Bachelor of Religious Education (BRE) (3 years)
 Bachelor of Theology (BTh) (4 years)

External links
Official Site

References

Evangelical seminaries and theological colleges in Canada
Universities and colleges affiliated with the Churches of Christ
Universities in Ontario
Educational institutions established in 1975
1975 establishments in Ontario
Waterloo, Ontario